Edward Burd Hubley (1792February 23, 1856) was a member of the U.S. House of Representatives from Pennsylvania.

Biography
Edward B. Hubley was born in Reading, Pennsylvania in 1792. He studied law, was admitted to the bar in 1820 and began his legal practice in Reading. He subsequently moved to Orwigsburg, Pennsylvania, which was the county seat of Schuylkill County, Pennsylvania.

Hubley was elected as a Jacksonian to the Twenty-fourth Congress and reelected as a Democrat to the Twenty-fifth Congress. 

He served as canal commissioner of Pennsylvania from 1839 to 1842, and was appointed, on November 8, 1842, as a commissioner to adjust and settle certain claims under the treaty with the Cherokee Indians of 1835. 

He then resumed the practice of law in Reading and later moved to Philadelphia, where he died in 1856. He was interred in the Charles Evans Cemetery in Reading, Pennsylvania.

References

Politicians from Reading, Pennsylvania
Pennsylvania lawyers
1792 births
1856 deaths
Burials at Charles Evans Cemetery
Jacksonian members of the United States House of Representatives from Pennsylvania
19th-century American politicians
Democratic Party members of the United States House of Representatives from Pennsylvania